Motorized may refer to:
 Motor vehicle
 especially an automobile
 Motorized military unit—see Armoured warfare
 any item containing a motor